HMS Altham was one of 93 ships of the  of inshore minesweepers.

Their names were all chosen from villages ending in -ham. The minesweeper was named after Altham in Lancashire.

Altham (pennant number M2602) was a member of the first series of Ham-class minesweepers, with composite wood and aluminium construction. It was built by Camper and Nicholsons of Gosport, completing on 8 July 1953.

The ship commissioned at Hythe, Hampshire on 13 July 1953, serving with the 232nd Mine Sweeper Squadron at Harwich in Essex from 1954 to 1956, going into reserve at Rosneath on the Gare Loch in northwest Scotland in 1957.

Altham was transferred to the Royal Malayan Navy on 1 April 1958, being renamed Sri Johor. Sri Johor had its minesweeping gear removed and replaced by two more 20 mm Oerlikon cannon and four 2-pounder saluting guns, although the minesweeping gear was later re-fitted. Sri Johor was broken up in 1967.

References

 

Ham-class minesweepers
Ships built in England
1952 ships
Cold War minesweepers of the United Kingdom
Royal Navy ship names
Ham-class minesweepers of the Royal Malaysian Navy